My Kali is an online pan-Arab LGBT magazine, published in Amman, Jordan in English since 2007 and in Arabic since 2016. It is named after its publisher, openly gay Jordanian model and activist Khalid "Kali" Abdel-Hadi.

History
My Kali was the first -inclusive online publication in Middle East. The magazine was established in late 2007 by a group of students with various interests ranging from design and arts to politics. The online magazine sought to address homophobia and transphobia and to empower Arab youth to defy gender-binary institutions and traditions.

In May 2016 My Kali began publishing an Arabic edition. Abdel-Hadi explained, "I want the publication to be reached by all, and not feel like it's excluding anyone." The publication of the Arabic edition increased interest in the magazine, which in turn led to the Jordanian government banning it. My Kali resumed publication in September 2017.

My Kali was noted for its role in the 2011 controversy surrounding Khalaf Yousef, a Muslim cleric in Jordan who publicly came out as gay on his YouTube channel. After coming out, Yousef was fired, disowned by his family, and began receiving death threats. This caused him to flee to Lebanon and then to Canada, where he received asylum. Yousef explained later that he was inspired to come out after seeing a copy of My Kali.

The magazine regularly features non-LGBT artists on its covers to promote acceptance among other communities and was the first publication to give many underground and regional artists—including Yasmine Hamdan, Haig Papazian and Hamed Hamed Sinno of Mashrou' Leila, Alaa Wardi, Zahed Sultan—their first cover stories. In addition to artists such as Jwan Yosef, Mykki Blanco, Habibitch and many more. The magazine has also dedicated a digital painting/cover of deceased activist Sarah Hegazi.

Founder

Khalid Abdel-Hadi founded My Kali in 2007 when he was 16 or 17 years old, with the aim of providing LGBT-related content. On 30 October 2007, a local Jordanian publication, Ammon News, reported on its launch, reprinting My Kali's cover image of a shirtless Abdel-Hadi, though it identified him only as a "gay Jordanian teen". This article was referenced by numerous publications, outing Abdel-Hadi. "During that time, you would hear news about people being hanged publicly in Iran, catfished and then arrested in Egypt, kidnapped in Syria, shot dead in the street in Iraq, and imprisoned in Saudi Arabia. I was only 18 at the time." Abdel-Hadi told i-D magazine in 2016. "The news came as a shock to the Jordanian society, as that was the first article to be written about LGBT+ people regarding Jordan, by a Jordanian media outlet."

Abdel-Hadi was born and raised in Amman, Jordan. His family has Palestinian and Kurdish-Turkish roots. He rarely makes media appearances outside his own publication and those of people who are close to him.  A journalist from newspaper Haaretz observed: "The magazine's success must be credited to Abdel-Hadi. Despite the numerous times he has been interviewed in the international press, not much has been revealed about his personal life. But he too is ready to serve as a personal example, to appear openly, and has also been photographed for the magazine's cover." The Haaretz article was considered a very controversial expose considering the publication's status, yet it wasn't commissioned or exclusive, but rather a write up that relied on other media references. Abdel-Hadi was listed as one of The Guardian's "LGBT change heroes of 2017".

Abdel-Hadi often collaborates with photographers and artists. In November 2017, for example, he was a subject for French photographer Scarlett Coten's series of portraits entitled "Mectoub" of young men from Middle Eastern countries. "We all have a feminine and a masculine side," the French photographer told The Guardian. Coten photographed Abdel-Hadi wearing a black high-waist swimsuit and heels.

In 2011, Abdel-Hadi angered many conservative LGBTQ Muslims by posing for a photoshoot in a speedo on Rainbow Street, Amman, with a mosque in the background. He later published a public apology for the shoot in Gay Star News.

See also
LGBT rights in Jordan

References

External links
Official website

LGBT in Jordan
LGBT-related magazines
English-language magazines
Magazines established in 2008
Magazines published in Jordan
2008 establishments in Jordan
Mass media in Amman
LGBT culture in the Middle East
LGBT culture in the Arab world